Hagbard Celine is a central protagonist in the Illuminatus trilogy of books by Robert Shea and Robert Anton Wilson, named after the legendary Viking hero Hagbard who died for love. In the Schrödinger's Cat trilogy, written after Illuminatus!, it is stated that 'Hagbard Celine' is a pseudonym, and his legal name is 'Howard Crane'.  However, the trilogy passes through many very different universes.

Character
Hagbard has parallels to Jules Verne's character, Captain Nemo. Both are genius captains aboard a fantastic submarine. Both are rogues who have mostly broken off from society, yet help the oppressed. Some have even theorized that Hagbard Celine is Captain Nemo, though Verne's Twenty Thousand Leagues Under the Sea is set in the second half of the nineteenth century. He is also comparable to a degree to Ragnar Danneskjold, a libertarian pirate in Ayn Rand's novel Atlas Shrugged, which is spoofed in the chronicles as "Telemachus Sneezed". Like Danneskjold, Hagbard participates in the black market, exploiting and resisting governments, and both characters have Norwegian roots.

Hagbard is a notorious prankster and liar (telling one character not to trust anyone with the initials H.C.). This character trait is displayed throughout Illuminatus!. Celine tends to give misinformation about himself and his intentions and that he faked the death of an actress, implied to be Marilyn Monroe, in order to train her into becoming an embodiment of the goddess Eris. Celine subsequently fell in love with the woman and announces his intention to marry her during the trilogy.

A Discordian anarchist, he fights the Illuminati from a golden submarine, the Leif Ericson (named after the Viking explorer) The submarine was supposedly designed and built by himself, stolen from the United States Navy, or a gift from the Mafia. Despite its size—the equivalent of five city blocks long with a three-story-high conning tower—it has so far remained undetected.

He has a Norwegian mother and a Sicilian father, and physically resembles Anthony Quinn.  In a section printed in the introductions of volumes I and II of the trilogy, though not reprinted in the single volume compilation, the narrator mentions that he has a raft of Irish relatives in Ohio named McGee and Marlowe.  Wilson also implies in The Historical Illuminatus Chronicles that Hagbard is related to one of the central characters, Sigismundo Celine.

He speaks Norwegian, Italian, English, German, Latin, Greek and Swahili. He graduated Harvard with the somewhat strange double major of contract law and naval engineering.

A former naturalized United States citizen, Hagbard supposedly relinquished his citizenship after representing a Mohawk reservation in court against the Bureau of Indian Affairs. Hagbard himself generally told people that he was an engineer building a dam during his time with the Mohawk because he was ashamed at having been a lawyer.

He later became a citizen of Equatorial Guinea of which Fernando Poo is a part; having papers referring to this by the time of the Walpurgisnacht rock concert. In the appendix to the trilogy, it mentions that Hagbard builds a starship and leaves to explore Alpha Centauri in the year 1999.

Hagbard designed a supercomputer called First Universal Cybernetic Kynetic Ultramicro-Programmer (FUCKUP). Among other things, he used FUCKUP to calculate the chances of World War III starting, which it does by throwing virtual I Ching sticks.

His manifesto is called Never Whistle While You're Pissing, containing his Definitions and Distinctions, an anarchist interpretation of capitalist concepts.

See also
 Celine's Laws

References

Fictional military captains
Fictional undersea characters
Fictional lawyers
Fictional engineers
Fictional pirates
Fictional outlaws
Fictional drug dealers
Fictional Norwegian people
Fictional Italian people in literature
Science fiction characters
Literary characters introduced in 1975
Characters in American novels of the 20th century
Robert Anton Wilson
Fictional people with acquired American citizenship